Brzozie  is a village in Brodnica County, Kuyavian-Pomeranian Voivodeship, in north-central Poland. It is the seat of the gmina (administrative district) called Gmina Brzozie.

The village has a population of 1,578.

References

Brzozie